Mongolian Supplement is a Unicode block containing additional Mongolian letters not found in Mongolian block in BMP.  It currently comprises nine variant forms of birga marks used to mark the start of text.

History
The following Unicode-related documents record the purpose and process of defining specific characters in the Mongolian Supplement block:

References 

Unicode blocks